Muereasca is a commune located in Vâlcea County, Oltenia, Romania. It is composed of eight villages: Andreiești, Frâncești-Coasta, Găvănești, Hotarele, Muereasca, Muereasca de Sus, Pripoara and Șuta.

References

Communes in Vâlcea County
Localities in Oltenia